The 11th ALMA Awards honored the accomplishments made by Hispanics in film, television, and music in 2008. The ceremony was held on September 17, 2009 at the Santa Monica Civic Auditorium.

The ceremony aired on ABC for the last time after 9 years, moving to NBC in 2011.

Winners and nominees 

The following is a list of the nominees from film, television, and music; the winners are bolded.

Year in TV Drama – Actor 
Benjamin Bratt, The Cleaner
Carlos Bernard, 24
Nestor Carbonell, Lost
Cristian de la Fuente, In Plain Sight
Jorge Garcia, Lost
Benito Martinez, The Shield
Esai Morales, Jericho
Enrique Murciano, Without A Trace
Amaury Nolasco, Prison Break
Edward James Olmos, Battlestar Galactica
Danny Pino, Cold Case
Adam Rodriguez, CSI: Miami
Miguel Sandoval, Medium
Jimmy Smits, Dexter
David Zayas, Dexter

Year in TV Drama – Actress 

Lauren Vélez, Dexter
Laura Cerón, ER
Alana De La Garza, Law & Order
Cote de Pablo, NCIS
Paula Garcés, The Shield
Julie Gonzalo, Eli Stone
Eva La Rue, CSI: Miami
Justina Machado, ER
Dania Ramirez, Heroes
Francia Raisa, The Secret Life of the American Teenager
Sara Ramirez, Grey's Anatomy
Michelle Rodriguez, Lost
Roselyn Sanchez, Without A Trace
Paola Turbay, The Secret Life of the American Teenager; The Closer

Year in TV Comedy – Actor 

Oscar Nuñez, The Office
Jake T. Austin, Wizards of Waverly Place (Disney Channel)
Demián Bichir, Weeds (Showtime)
Ricardo Antonio Chavira, Desperate Housewives (ABC)
Joshua Gomez, Chuck (NBC)
Mark Indelicato, Ugly Betty (ABC)
George Lopez, Mr. Troop Mom (Nickelodeon)
Tony Plana, Ugly Betty (ABC)
James Roday, Psych (USA)
Horatio Sanz, In the Motherhood (ABC)
Charlie Sheen, Two and a Half Men (CBS)

Year in TV Comedy – Actress 

Selena Gomez, Wizards of Waverly Place
Jessica Alba, The Office (NBC)
Maria Canals-Barrera, Wizards of Waverly Place (Disney Channel)
America Ferrera, Ugly Betty (ABC)
Joanna Garcia, Privileged (CW)
Salma Hayek, 30 Rock (NBC)
Eva Longoria, Desperate Housewives (ABC)
Lupe Ontiveros, Reaper (CW)
Ana Ortiz, Ugly Betty (ABC)
Judy Reyes, Scrubs (ABC)
Rosie Perez, Lipstick Jungle (NBC)
Jamie-Lynn Sigler, Entourage (HBO)
Nadine Velazquez, My Name Is Earl (NBC)

Year in Music 

David Archuleta
Christina Aguilera
Black Eyed Peas
Lynda Carter
Kat DeLuna
Enrique Iglesias
Demi Lovato
Maxwell
Pitbull

Year in Film – Actor 

John Leguizamo, Nothing Like the Holidays
Javier Bardem, Vicky Cristina Barcelona
Clifton Collins Jr., Star Trek; Crank: High Voltage
Luis Guzmán, The Taking of Pelham 123
Cheech Marin, Race To Witch Mountain
Alfred Molina, Pink Panther 2
Oscar Nuñez, The Proposal
Joaquin Phoenix, Two Lovers
Efren Ramirez, Crank: High Voltage
Freddy Rodriguez, Nothing Like the Holidays
Ramon Rodriguez, Transformers: Revenge of The Fallen

Year in Film – Actress 

Penélope Cruz, Vicky Cristina Barcelona
Rosario Dawson, Seven Pounds
Cameron Diaz, My Sister's Keeper
Eva Mendes, The Women; The Spirit
Elizabeth Peña, Nothing Like the Holidays
Michelle Rodriguez, Fast & Furious
Zoe Saldana, Star Trek
Sofía Vergara, Madea Goes to Jail

Year in Documentaries 

Latino Public Broadcasting (LPB)

Year Behind the Scenes – Director 
Alfredo De Villa - Nothing Like the Holidays

Year Behind the Scenes – Writer 
Rick Najera - Nothing Like the Holidays

Year Behind the Scenes – Hair Stylist 
Mary Ann Valdes - Twilight/Ugly Betty

Year Behind the Scenes – Makeup 
Jeanne Van Phue - Twilight

Fashion Icon 
Jessica Alba

Anthony Quinn Award for Industry Excellence 
Salma Hayek

Special Achievement in Sports Television 
Oscar De La Hoya

The 2009 PepsiCo Adelante ALMA Award 
Raul Yzaguirre

ALMA
011
Latin American film awards